The North Wilkesboro Micropolitan Statistical Area, as defined by the United States Census Bureau, is a populated area consisting of the whole of Wilkes County, North Carolina, anchored by the town of North Wilkesboro.

Demographics
As of the census of 2010, there were 69,340 people, 28,360 households, and 19,683 families residing within the μSA. The racial makeup of the μSA was 90.60% White, 4.08% African American, 0.19% Native American, 0.43% Asian, 0.03% Pacific Islander, 3.33% from other races, and 1.33% from two or more races. Hispanic or Latino of any race were 5.44% of the population.

The median income for a household in the μSA was $31,869, and the median income for a family was $39,980. Males had a median income of $32,237 versus $25,368 for females. The per capita income for the μSA was $16,797.

See also 
 Table of United States Micropolitan Statistical Areas
 North Carolina statistical areas

References 

Micropolitan areas of North Carolina
Geography of Wilkes County, North Carolina